Rightangle Peak is a small rock peak between Snowplume Peak and Camelback Ridge, in the Jones Mountains. It was mapped by the University of Minnesota-Jones Mountains Party of 1960–61. It was named so by the party because the feature presented a right angle profile facing west when viewed from Camp Minnesota (from northward).

See also
 Mountains in Antarctica

References
 

Mountains of Ellsworth Land